George Asamoah (born 4 November 1997) is a Ghanaian footballer who currently plays as a central midfielder for Ghana Premier League side Accra Great Olympics.

Early life 
Asamoah was born in Maamobi, a suburb of Accra, Ghana's capital. He started his career playing in the third-their league, Ghana Division Two League before being scouted and securing a move to International Allies.

Career

Inter Allies 
Asamoah started his professional career with International Allies in late 2014. He made his debut on 25 January 2015 after coming on in the 57th minute for Prosper Kasim during a goalless draw against Liberty Professionals. In 2016, he became a key member of the side, starting the first match of the season and playing 83 minutes of 2–1 loss to Liberty Professionals before being substituted for Seidu Haruna. He ended the 2016 Ghanaian Premier League season with twelve league appearances.

WAFA 
Asamoah joined West African Football Academy (WAFA) in May 2018 on a free transfer after he impressed their technical team during trials after his contract with Inter Allies expired. He made his debut on 24 May 2018 after coming on in the 71st minute for Umar Bashiru. He played the next two matches, however the league was cancelled due to the dissolution of the GFA in June 2018, as a result of the Anas Number 12 Expose. He left the club in July 2019.

Ebusua Dwarfs 
In October 2020, Asamoah joined fellow Ghanaian club Cape Coast Ebusua Dwarfs ahead of the 2020–21 season. On 15 November 2020, he made his debut after making the starting line up and playing the full 90 minutes in a 2–2 draw against their fierce rivals Elmina Sharks. On 3 February 2021, in a match against Ashanti Gold, he scored made an assist for Dennis Nkrumah-Korsah and scored his debut goal, the winning goal to help them secure a 2–1 victory.

He ended the season with 7 goals goal involvements in the defensive midfield role, scoring 3 goals and provided 4 assists along with four man of the match accolades.

Great Olympics 
With Asamoah's contract ending and Ebusua Dwarfs being relegated to the Ghana Division One League, he became a transfer target for several clubs including Hearts of Oak and Asante Kotoko. However, on 3 September 2021, he signed a one-year contract with Accra Great Olympics with an option of further renewal at the end of the season.

References

External links 

 

Living people
1997 births
International Allies F.C. players
West African Football Academy players
Ebusua Dwarfs players
Ghana Premier League players
Association football midfielders
Ghanaian footballers